Statistics of Emperor's Cup in the 1961 season.

Overview
It was contested by 16 teams, and Furukawa Electric won the championship.

Results

1st Round
Toyo Industries 3–0 Waseda University WMW
Hitachi 3–0 Nagoya Bank
Toyama Soccer 0–2 Chuo University
Teijin Matsuyama 2–3 Kwangaku Club
Kwangaku Club 0–3 Shida Soccer
Furukawa Electric 2–1 Nippon Dunlop
Sendai Ikuen Gakuen High School 2–4 Rikkyo University
Hokkai Gakuen University 1–12 Yawata Steel

Quarterfinals
Toyo Industries 1–0 Hitachi
Chuo University 2–1 Kwangaku Club
Shida Soccer 1–3 Furukawa Electric
Rikkyo University 1–4 Yawata Steel

Semifinals
Toyo Industries 0–0 (lottery) Chuo University
Furukawa Electric 2–1 Yawata Steel

Final
  
Chuo University 2–3 Furukawa Electric
Furukawa Electric won the championship.

References
 NHK

Emperor's Cup
1961 in Japanese football